The 2010 WAFU Club Championship (sometimes referred to as the Eyadema Unity Cup) is an association football competition that is contested between club sides in the WAFU/UFOA region.

First round
First leg matches were played 15th and 16 May 2010. Second leg matches took place 29th and 30 May.

ZONE A

|}

ZONE B

|}

Second round

|}

Tornadoes-Stella first leg clash postponed a week to August 22 due to Stella's travel problem. Match then postponed again to Aug 29 Second leg held Sept. 12

Third round
First Leg- October 3. Second Leg October 17–19 (Sharks at Stella postponed to October 27)

|}

Repechage
Winner makes Semifinals. First leg Second week of November

|}

Semifinals
To take place in Lome.
   AC Semassi F.C.
  Casa Sport
  Sharks FC
  Horoya AC
Champion wins 10 million CFA Francs.

Final

References

2010
2010 in African football